(b. March 4, 1946 in Meguro, Tokyo, Japan.) is a Japanese actress, author and producer at Tsuburaya Productions.

Filmography

Movie

TV

Books by Sakurai
  (1994, Shōgakukan) 
  (2003, Shōgakukan) .
  (2005, Kadokawashoten) .

External links
 

1946 births
Japanese actresses
People from Meguro
Living people